Gondophares III Gudana (Kharosthi: 𐨒𐨂𐨡𐨥𐨪 𐨒𐨂𐨜𐨣), or Gadana, also called Orthagnes (Ancient Greek: ΟΡΘΑΓΝΗϹ Orthagnēs), was an Indo-Parthian king. He may have ruled circa 20–30 CE (25-55 CE according to Mitchiner). He was one of the successors of Gondophares, together with Abdagases, Sases, Gondophares II, Sarpedones, and Pacores. He may have ruled from Arachosia to Eastern Punjab.

Notes

Indo-Parthian kings
1st-century monarchs in Asia
Year of death unknown
Year of birth unknown
1st-century Iranian people